Megachile abdominalis is a species of bee in the family Megachilidae. It was described by Smith in 1853. The species can be found in northern and eastern Australia.

References

Abdominalis
Insects described in 1853